Damien LeRoy, sometimes known professionally as DJ Ammo (also simply as Ammo), is an American disc jockey and music producer from Los Angeles, California. He has co-produced "The Time (Dirty Bit)" along with three other songs from The Black Eyed Peas' sixth studio album, The Beginning, and "4th of July (Fireworks)" by Kelis. DJ Ammo produced the song "Touch the Sky" by Sean Paul, which was included in his fifth studio album, Tomahawk Technique. He also co-wrote and co-produced the song "Tik Tik Boom" by Britney Spears for her eighth studio album, Britney Jean.

Early life
Hip-hop led the fledgling producer behind the board for the very first time. In junior high, he began making his own beats, while religiously attending professional acting school and spending time on the sets of stepfather's films. As a teenager, he assumed the moniker DJ Ammo and officially hit the clubs. Whilst doing this, he eventually met Black Eyed Peas. Organically, he became friends with will.i.am and apl.de.ap, leading to his very first remix. They invited him on the World Tour in 2009 as a DJ and producer for Black Eyed Peas, and Ammo spent the next 5 years performing in front of packed arenas and festivals all around the world.

Later life
In 2010, will.i.am tapped Ammo to handle the production of six tacks on the Black Eyed Peas album The Beginning, including the chart-topping singles "The Time (Dirty Bit)" "Don't Stop the Party" and “ Just Can’t Get Enough. From there, he went on to produce and remix high-profile tracks for everyone from Nicki Minaj Sean Paul, Lil' Jon to LMFAO, Peaches and Dragonette. At the same time, he started writing tracks of his own. His edgy approach to EDM encompassed a sexy rave power, while delicately infusing pop palatability.

In 2013, he produced 3 songs on the new will.i.am #willpower album including the single #thatPOWER featuring Justin Bieber. Among his own singles, Damien Leroy’s unleashed the distorted flurry "Party Police” Feat. Chebacca. Live, he's performed in various clubs around the world as well as at Electric Daisy Carnival (EDC) 2012 alongside some of the titans of the genre.

In 2017, he produced 2 singles on Fergie's Double Dutchess Album. "There's a lot of crossover," he says in an interview. "I'm heavily evolved in the underground world. When I do things in pop, I try to take those influences and filter them through the mainstream. I like existing in the indie and commercial realms simultaneously.” He continues, “I'm always trying to push the borders and pioneer something new, I want to come up with something fresh that hasn't been done yet.

Discography

As featured artist

References

External links
Official website

Living people
Year of birth missing (living people)
Songwriters from California
American hip hop record producers
Musicians from Baltimore